Baby Bath Massacre is a 1994 Australian film directed by Stuart McDonald and starring Maya Stange and Sullivan Stapleton. It was a spin-off from the TV series Raw.

References

External links
Baby Bath Massacre at Screen Australia
Baby Bath Massacre at IMDb

Australian drama films
1990s English-language films
1990s Australian films